Hsiao-hung Nancy Chen is a Taiwanese politician. She was the Deputy Minister of the Council for Economic Planning and Development of the Executive Yuan until 21 January 2014.

Education
Chen obtained her master's degree in regional and community development from University of Missouri in the United States and doctoral degree in economic and social development from University of Pittsburgh.

Political careers
Chen was the Deputy Minister of the Council for Economic Planning and Development from 17 September 2012 until 21 January 2014 and senior advisor to the President from 10 February until 31 July 2014.

References

Living people
Women government ministers of Taiwan
Government ministers of Taiwan
Chinese Culture University alumni
University of Missouri alumni
University of Pittsburgh alumni
Year of birth missing (living people)